Amirul Hamizan bin Ibrahim (born 3 December 1981) is a Malaysian weightlifter.

His biggest achievement is winning three gold medals in the 56-kilogram category at the 2002 Commonwealth Games in Manchester.

At the 2008 Asian Championships he ranked 4th in the 56 kg category, with a total of 262 kg.

He competed in Weightlifting at the 2008 Summer Olympics in the 56 kg division finishing eighth, with a new personal best of 265 kg. He beat his previous best by 3 kg.

He is 5 ft 3 inches tall.

Controversy 
In June 2005, Amirul Hamizan Ibrahim has tested positive for banned substance namely steroids in an out-of-competition test conducted by the National Sports Council of Malaysia and faced a ban of two years.

Honours

Honours of Malaysia
  : Medallist of the Order of the Defender of the Realm (P.P.N.) (2003)
  : Member of the Order of the Defender of the Realm (A.M.N.) (2004)

Notes and references

External links
 NBC profile
 Athlete Biography IBRAHIM Amirul Hamizan at beijing2008

Malaysian male weightlifters
1981 births
Living people
Malaysian people of Malay descent
Weightlifters at the 2008 Summer Olympics
Olympic weightlifters of Malaysia
Commonwealth Games medallists in weightlifting
Commonwealth Games gold medallists for Malaysia
Weightlifters at the 2010 Commonwealth Games
Asian Games competitors for Malaysia
Weightlifters at the 2002 Asian Games
Southeast Asian Games silver medalists for Malaysia
Southeast Asian Games gold medalists for Malaysia
Southeast Asian Games bronze medalists for Malaysia
Southeast Asian Games medalists in weightlifting
Medallists of the Order of the Defender of the Realm
Members of the Order of the Defender of the Realm
Competitors at the 2001 Southeast Asian Games
20th-century Malaysian people
21st-century Malaysian people
Medallists at the 2010 Commonwealth Games